Deserpidine (INN) or reserpidine (USAN) is an antihypertensive drug related to reserpine which occurs naturally in Rauvolfia spp.

References

Alkaloids found in Rauvolfia
Antihypertensive agents
Benzoate esters
Tryptamine alkaloids
Indoloquinolizines
Quinolizidine alkaloids
Monoamine-depleting agents
Pyrogallol ethers
VMAT inhibitors